This is a list of mayors of the city of Solothurn, Switzerland. The mayor (Stadtpräsident, earlier Stadtammann) chairs the city council (Gemeinderat), Solothurn's executive with 30 members.

References 
 Scheidegger, Urs: "Es war nicht immer so...", 1st Vol. Vogt-Schild, Solothurn 1985. .

Solothurn
Mayors of Grenchen, List
Lists of mayors (complete 1900-2013)